Anastomopsidae is an extinct family of fossil gastropods in the superfamily Punctoidea. It was originally described in 1986 and its classification was confirmed in 2005.

Genera 
The family Anastomopsidae has no subfamilies.

Genera within the family Anastomopsidae include:
 Anastomopsis - the type genus

References

 
Gastropods described in 1986